Greg Thompson (born c. 1948) was a Canadian football player who played for the Ottawa Rough Riders and Edmonton Eskimos. He won the Grey Cup with Ottawa in 1969. He previously played junior football with the Ottawa Sooners.

References

1940s births
Living people
Edmonton Elks players
Ottawa Rough Riders players
Canadian football running backs